Ancell may refer to:

People with the surname
 Bobby Ancell (1911–1987), Scottish football player
 Samuel Ancell (1760–1802), English soldier
 Nathan S. Ancell (1908–1999), American businessman

Other uses
 Ancell, Missouri, a community in the US
 Ancell school of business, Connecticut, US